Chinese Martyrs is the name given to a number of members of the Catholic Church and the Eastern Orthodox Church who were killed in China during the 19th and early 20th centuries. They are celebrated as martyrs by their respective churches. Most were Chinese laity, but others were missionaries from various other countries; many of them died during the Boxer Rebellion.

Eastern Orthodox 

The Eastern Orthodox Church recognizes 222 Orthodox Christians who died during the Boxer Rebellion as "Holy Martyrs of China". On the evening of 11 June 1900 leaflets were posted in the streets, calling for the massacre of the Christians and threatening anyone who would dare to shelter them with death.

They were mostly members of the Chinese Orthodox Church, which had been under the guidance of the Russian Orthodox since the 17th century and maintained close relations with them, especially in the large Russian community in Harbin. They are called new-martyrs, as they died under a modern regime. The first of these martyrs was Metrophanes, Chi Sung, leader of the Peking Mission, who was killed, along with his family, during the Boxer Rebellion. All told, 222 members of the Peking Mission died.

Roman Catholic

The Roman Catholic Church recognizes 120 Catholics who died between 1648 and 1930 as its "Martyr Saints of China". They were canonized by Pope John Paul II on 1 October 2000. Of the group, 87 were Chinese laypeople and 33 were missionaries; 86 died during the Boxer Rebellion in 1900. The Chinese Martyrs Catholic Church in Toronto, Ontario is named for them.

Protestant 

Many Protestants also died during the Boxer Rebellion, including the "China Martyrs of 1900", but there is no formal veneration (according to their religious beliefs) nor a universally recognized list.

At least 189 missionaries and 500 native Chinese Protestant Christians were murdered in 1900 alone. Though some missionaries considered themselves non-denominationally Protestant, among those killed were Baptists, Evangelicals, Anglicans, Lutherans, Methodists, Presbyterians and Plymouth Brethren.

See also
 Christianization
 Persecution of Christians

References

Further reading

External links
Canonisation of 120 Chinese martyrs: has much changed under communism?
The First Chinese Saints
Orthodox.cn Account of the Orthodox Chinese Martyrs

19th-century Eastern Orthodox martyrs
19th-century Roman Catholic martyrs
19th-century Christian saints
20th-century Roman Catholic martyrs
20th-century Christian saints
Chinese saints of the Eastern Orthodox Church
Russian saints of the Eastern Orthodox Church
Chinese Roman Catholic saints
Roman Catholic child saints
Groups of Eastern Orthodox saints
Groups of Roman Catholic saints
Chinese
People of the Boxer Rebellion
Eastern Orthodox missionaries
Roman Catholic missionaries in China
Franciscan Missionaries of Mary
China–Russian Empire relations